Salluit ("the thin ones") is the second northernmost Inuit community in Quebec, Canada, located on Sugluk Inlet close to the Hudson Strait and was formerly known as Sugluk. Its population was 1,483 in the Canada 2016 Census and the population centre had 1,075 people. It is not accessible by road, but by air through Salluit Airport.

Salluit means "The Thin Ones" in Inuktitut, referring to a time when local inhabitants were facing starvation as a result of a lack of wildlife.

History 
In 1925, an independent trader opened a trading post on the site of present-day Salluit.

In 1930, the HBC built a store at present-day Salluit and closed its post at Deception Bay in 1932. The golden years of fur trading came to an end around 1936 when the price of pelts collapsed.

In 1930 a Catholic mission was established, closing some twenty years later, but followed by an Anglican mission in 1955. The Government of Canada opened a day school in 1957. As more public services were being delivered, Inuit settled around the small village.

The first residential houses were built in 1959 and ten years later a co-operative store was established by its residents. Salluit legally became a municipality in 1979.

Since 1996, the police services in Salluit are provided by the Kativik Regional Police Force.

Demographics 

Education
The Kativik School Board operates two schools in Salluit.

The first is Pigiurvik School, which is the primary school.

The second is Ikusik School, which is the secondary school.

Students attend Pigiurvik from Grade 1 to Grade 5, before attending Ikusik for Grade 6 to Secondary V.

Notable residents 
 Elisapie Isaac, pop singer
Lucy Qinnuayuak, artist, born in Salluit
Lissie Saggiak, artist
 Sugluk (band), rock group
 Maggie MacDonnell, teacher, awarded the "Global Teacher Prize" of the Varkey Foundation 2017.

See also 
 Ivujivik, the northernmost settlement in Quebec

References

External links 

 Official website
 Nunavik Tourism, Salluit website
 Northern light in Salluit
 Project: Municipal case studies: The planning process and climate change

Inuit communities in Quebec
Road-inaccessible communities of Quebec